There were six special elections to the United States House of Representatives in 1991 during the 102nd United States Congress.

List of elections 

Elections are listed by date and district.

|-
| 
| data-sort-value="Conte, Silvio O." | Silvio O. Conte
|  | Republican
| 1958
|  data-sort-value=-1 | Incumbent died February 8, 1991.New member elected June 18, 1991.Democratic gain.
| nowrap | 

|-
| 
| data-sort-value="Madigan, Edward Rell." | Edward Rell Madigan
|  | Republican
| 1972
|  data-sort-value=0 | Incumbent resigned upon appointment as United States Secretary of Agriculture. New member elected July 2, 1991.Republican hold.
| nowrap | 

|-
| 
| data-sort-value="Bartlett, Steve." | Steve Bartlett
|  | Republican
| 1982
|  data-sort-value=0 | Incumbent resigned March 11, 1991 to become Mayor of Dallas. New member elected May 18, 1991.Republican hold.
| nowrap | 

|-
| 
| data-sort-value="Udall, Mo" | Mo Udall
|  | Democratic
| 1961 
|  data-sort-value=0 | Incumbent resigned for health reasons.New member elected October 3, 1991.Democratic hold.
| nowrap | 

|-
| 
| data-sort-value="Gray, William H." | William H. Gray III
|  | Democratic
| 1978
|  data-sort-value=0 | Incumbent resigned to become director of the United Negro College Fund.New member elected November 5, 1991.Democratic hold.
| nowrap | 

|-
| 
| data-sort-value="Slaughter, D. French." | D. French Slaughter Jr.
|  | Republican
| 1984
|  data-sort-value=0 | Incumbent resigned due to ill health (stroke). New member elected November 5, 1991.Republican hold.
| nowrap | 

|}

See also 
 List of special elections to the United States House of Representatives
 102nd United States Congress

References 

 
1991